Impfingen is a district of Tauberbischofsheim with 1023 residents.

Geography
Impfingen is located north of Tauberbischofsheim in the Tauberfranken region of Franconia.

History
Impfingen is one of seven districts of Tauberbischofsheim. The other districts are the town of Tauberbischofsheim, as well as Dienstadt, Distelhausen, Dittigheim, Dittwar and Hochhausen.

Impfingen was incorporated to Tauberbischofsheim during the local government reform in Baden-Württemberg on January 1, 1971.

References

External links

Villages in Baden-Württemberg
Main-Tauber-Kreis
Historic Jewish communities